The 2011 Open de Suède Vårgårda was the 6th road race running on the Open de Suède Vårgårda. The race was won by Annemiek van Vleuten ahead of Ellen van Dijk and Nicole Cooke.

General standings (top 10)

Results from uci.ch.

References

External links
 Official website

2011 in women's road cycling
2011 in Swedish sport
2011 UCI Women's Road World Cup
2011